The Danville Historic District, also known as the Millionaire's Row and Old West End Historic District, is a national historic district located at Danville, Virginia. In 1973, the  district included 272 contributing buildings.  They are considered the finest and most concentrated collection of Victorian and Edwardian residential architecture in Virginia. It includes notable examples of the Gothic Revival and Romanesque Revival styles.  Located in the district is the separately listed Langhorne House, Penn-Wyatt House, and the Sutherlin Mansion, the last official residence of President Jefferson Davis.

It was listed on the National Register of Historic Places in 1973.

References

National Register of Historic Places in Danville, Virginia
Gothic Revival architecture in Virginia
Romanesque Revival architecture in Virginia
Historic districts on the National Register of Historic Places in Virginia
Tourist attractions in Danville, Virginia